Pamplin may refer to:

 Pamplin City, Virginia

People with the surname
 Robert B. Pamplin
 Robert B. Pamplin, Jr.
 Rocky Pamplin
 William Pamplin (1806–1899), Englisher bookseller and botanist

See also
 Pamplin Media Group
 Pamplin Music
 Pamplin College of Business, Virginia Tech
 Pamplin School of Business, University of Portland